The ACC women's basketball tournament is the conference championship tournament in basketball for the Atlantic Coast Conference (ACC). The tournament has been held every year since 1978, several years before the first NCAA championships for women. It is a single-elimination tournament and seeding is based on regular season records. The winner, declared conference champion, receives the conference's automatic bid to the NCAA Women's Division I Basketball Championship.

Championship game results

* record attendance.

Tournament most valuable players

Performance by school

Italics indicate a school no longer in the conference.

Wake Forest reached the semifinals in 1986, 1988, and 2012; Boston College reached the semifinals in 2010 and 2020;  Virginia Tech reached the semifinals in 2022; Pittsburgh reached the 2nd round in 2015, 2016, and 2020.

Tournament sites

On May 15, 2014, it was announced that the tournament will be held in Greensboro through 2022.  However, the ACC moved the 2017 tournament to the Myrtle Beach area as part of an all conference political protest against North Carolina's Public Facilities Privacy & Security Act.

See also

ACC men's basketball tournament

References